Craig Taborn Trio is the debut album by American jazz pianist Craig Taborn.  It was recorded in 1994 and released on the Japanese DIW label.

Background
After completing Jurassic Classics with the James Carter Quartet, Taborn appropriated unused studio time to record this album with bandmates bassist Jaribu Shahid and drummer Tani Tabbal: "We three rehearsed for a couple hours before the hit and recorded for two days. I picked tunes that weren't too difficult yet were valid and representative of my stuff". Taborn wrote several of these songs for a straightahead, neo-bop style, and covered under-recorded compositions such as Ornette Coleman's "Compassion", Horace Silver's "Shirl" and John Coltrane's Paul Chambers featured "Bass Blues".

Reception

In his review for AllMusic, Ken Dryden says that the album "showcases the talented pianist in a variety of settings ranging from post-bop and hard bop to free jazz and avant-garde jazz."

In a combined review with two James Carter's albums for Down Beat, Jon Andrews notes that "Taborn has the same omnivorous esthetic as Carter, assimilating contemporary piano styles as diverse as Keith Jarrett and Cecil Taylor."

Track listing
All compositions by Craig Taborn except as indicated
 "David the Goliath" – 4:01
 "Compassion" (Ornette Coleman) – 7:02 
 "Scar" (Andrew Dahlke) – 6:07
 "A Man of Action" – 5:27
 "Shirl" (Horace Silver) – 5:27
 "Over the Water" – 5:45
 "The Temple" – 4:20
 "Bass Blues" (John Coltrane) – 5:34
 "The Soul of Grace" – 6:31
 "Uproot" – 5:31

Personnel
Craig Taborn – piano
Jaribu Shahid – bass
Tani Tabbal – drums

References

1994 albums
Craig Taborn albums
DIW Records albums